Raphael, nicknamed Raph, is a superhero and one of the four main characters of the Teenage Mutant Ninja Turtles comics and all related media. In most iterations, he's usually depicted as the second oldest/mid-middle-child of the turtle brothers, often at odds with his older brother, Leonardo.

He is usually depicted wearing a red eye mask; in this regard, he is the only turtle to retain this color since the original incarnation of the characters, as the remaining turtles received different colors at a later time. Raphael wields twin sai as his primary weapon. He is commonly portrayed in media as speaking with a Brooklyn accent. Raphael is known for his temperamental and cynical personality, being short-tempered, aggressive, sullen, maddened, sarcastic, and rebellious. The origin of Raphael's anger is not always fully explored, but in some incarnations appears to stem partly from the realization that they are the only creatures of their kind and ultimately alone, while also bothered by the injustice the helpless and innocent suffer.

Raphael has a frequent rivalry with his only older brother Leonardo because the latter is seen as the group's leader. He is the second eldest of the turtles and serves as the team's enforcer. These two concepts has been altered in one of the most recent versions of the franchise, with Raph being the oldest and opposing Leonardo due to his irresponsible attitude, not taking the role as leader seriously. Like all of the brothers, he is named after a Renaissance artist; in this case, he is named after the 16th-century Italian painter Raphael. In 2011, Raphael placed 23rd on IGN's Top 100 Comic Book Heroes, a list that did not feature any of his brothers. He is the only Teenage Turtle brother whose name does not end in the letter "O", even though the artist he got his name from is "Raffaello".

Comic books

Mirage Comics
In the earliest black-and-white Mirage Comics, Raphael was the most violent turtle and had a tendency for going berserk either in battle or when his temper flared up. He has a somewhat cynical and sarcastic sense of humor. In later issues, it is shown that he is not particularly fond of the supernatural, stating so explicitly in Tales of Raphael: Bad Moon Rising.

Raphael mellowed somewhat as the series went on, possibly a key moment for his character development was when he allowed Leonardo to go in alone to defeat The Shredder after nearly being killed by the Foot Elite. Since then, he has been less likely to challenge Leonardo's leadership, and on the whole is more friendly towards his family and allies.

Of his three brothers, Raphael is actually closest to Michelangelo, having stated this in the fourth issue of the Mirage TMNT comics. Raphael often shows a caring, more laid-back, side of himself when around his youngest brother, frequently indulging the young turtle emotionally when at home and ferociously protecting him from harm when in battle. Raphael openly admits that the mere thought of his youngest brother being grievously injured causes him to experience violent rage. In his self-titled one-shot miniseries, Raphael meets human vigilante Casey Jones, his foil, who is more violent and unstable than he was. Despite their brutal first meeting, the two have since formed a close bond.

In the Mirage comic book series' Volume 4, he is still the most violent turtle, but is more sociable. After having been bitten by a vampire-like creature, he experienced a further mutation, and became a large, dinosaur-like version of himself. He went into a state of berserk animal rage because of it, but with some guidance by an inner manifestation of Master Splinter, he regained his original mentality and later assisted Leonardo and Casey Jones in tracking down the vampires who attacked him. This is also somewhat similar to an earlier storyline during Volume 1, where Raphael was attacked by a leech-like creature who, when sucking his blood, also drained him of the mutagen in his body and reverted him to a small turtle. The leech itself mutated and vanished, prompting the remaining turtles to follow it. Finally, after tracking down the creature, Raphael manages to bite it and pierce its skin, thereby drinking its blood and mutating back.

This incarnation of Raphael appeared in the crossover special Turtles Forever voiced by Sean Schemmel.

Image Comics
In the Image series that treated the first two volumes of the Mirage Comics as canonical, Raphael was blasted in the face and disfigured. After that, he wore one of Casey Jones' hockey masks for much of the time, and eventually just an eye patch. Later, Raphael wore Shredder's armor in an attempt to psychologically dominate a number of the New York Mob, with whom the Foot Clan was engaged in a losing gang war. He donned a slightly variant version of the armor, and pretended to be the Shredder to get the advantage on his pursuers. He succeeded in defeating them and was then accepted into, and given control of, the New York faction of the Foot Clan for a brief time. In the independent published series of the Image Comics #24, Raphael had an eyepatch and red bandana for the whole issue and was even angrier than ever. He killed Cheng with whom he had been friends in issue #25, and as soon as Pimiko was killed by the gauntlet of Lady Shredder, Raph removed his bandana and eyepatch to reveal his left eye was no longer disfigured but was back to normal. He later said to Leonardo he had a thing for Pimiko, and like Donatello with Baxter's help in ridding him of cyborg parts, Raphael kept his crush on Pimiko a secret.

Archie Comics

The Archie comics series was titled Teenage Mutant Ninja Turtles Adventures and began as a direct adaptation of the popular cartoon series in the late 1980s. After the second story arc, Raphael changed costumes and began wearing an all-dark ninja outfit which he won during an Alien Wrestling Match. He would be the first member of the Teenage Mutant Ninja Turtles to have a girlfriend, meeting Ninjara in issue #28 and breaking up near the end of the magazine's 75-issue run. In the future, Raphael would lose an eye during a conflict with the Shredder, Verminator X, and Armaggon (in most of the future timeline incarnations of Raphael, his left eye is missing). He would time travel after his brother Donatello invents the technology and eventually retire on the island Turtleco (which used to be Manhattan) and become a bar owner.

IDW Comics
In the IDW Comics, Raphael, like his brothers, is one of the reincarnated sons of Hamato Yoshi, who in medieval Japan were murdered by Oroku Saki. He began his new life in the present as a young turtle in the laboratory of StockGen Research, Inc., Baxter Stockman's genetics laboratory and served as a guinea pig for an experiment to be grown to be a naturally armored super soldier. Some ninja tried to seize the Turtles and various other research results from the laboratory, including a mutagen. The intervention also led his reincarnated father, now a lab rat, and the Turtles to be doused with a chemical cocktail that triggered their mutation.

Shortly before his mutation Raphael was separated from his family during an attack from a hungry street cat. He panicked as he mutated and was taken under the wing of a homeless man named Buck. However, Buck was murdered by street thugs, inspiring rage and grief in Raphael.

In the fifteen months after his mutation, he resided as a vagrant on the streets of New York City without a memory of his life before his transformation, or even of a name. During this time, his brothers regularly searched for him, but did not find him. After befriending Casey Jones during a domestic dispute, Raphael was attacked by Old Hob, the street cat now mutated, but the other Turtles intervened and brought an uncertain but happy Raphael home to Splinter. He trained extensively with them for the next month, making incredible progress and being rewarded with a pair of sais as a result.

His new family's status was soon put to the test when their home was attacked by M.O.U.S.E.R. robots and Splinter was abducted. Raphael fought alongside his brothers to get their father back but came to the attention of the Shredder and the Foot Clan in the process.

Despite joining his brothers in their training and patrols, Raphael maintained his friendship with Casey by sometimes going out and assaulting criminals. When Casey was badly beaten by his father, Raphael lost his temper and set out to murder the man, but was stopped by Splinter, who taught him that he fights with too much anger.

His anger was turned inward during the City Fall storyline, in which rescuing a stabbed Casey from Shredder led to Leonardo being captured and brainwashed into Shredder's second-in-command. Devastated, Raphael blamed the entire event on himself, and savagely attacked Foot Clan from informants until Michelangelo and Donatello stopped him. When Splinter and the Turtles tried to extract the brainwashed Leonardo from Shredder's clutches, Raphael managed to penetrate some of the brainwashing and remind Leo of who they were.

At the O'Neil Farm in Northampton, Raphael clashed again with the emotionally-disturbed Leonardo, until Leonardo physically attacked him. From then on, Raphael watched and guarded his brother from a distance; including keeping Alopex away from him but did not engage him. He became more friendly with the mutant fox Alopex, though any trust he had for her was still shaky and he incorrectly believed that she had betrayed them when the Foot attacked.

Due to Hob's early efforts to kill him, Raphael remained extremely wary of Old Hob and did not believe that their family should be working with him. Despite this wariness, he still went on errands to Hob on Splinter's behalf.

During the Turtles in Time event, Raphael was captured by Utroms in prehistoric times, and adopted a small dinosaur he named Pepperoni. When Leonardo attempted to change the past by killing Oroku Saki in medieval Japan, it was Raphael who talked him out of it. He participated in the attack on the Technodrome with his brothers Leonardo and Michelangelo, where they fought Krang. However, he was devastated upon returning to New York, where a dying Donatello was barely saved by the Fugitoid by being transferred into the body of the robot Metalhead. Raphael remained convinced that Donatello was not really "alive" and that the Fugitoid would not be able to save his life. In particular, he blamed himself for leaving Donatello behind.

When Splinter entered his family into the Gauntlet, an ancient ritual that would end the bloody conflict between them and the Foot, Raphael was pitted against the powerful but dimwitted Rocksteady, who had nearly beaten Donatello to death. He and Michelangelo used their skill and agility to pit Bebop and Rocksteady against each other. He participated in the final fight against Shredder along with his brothers, with his father as the victor.

When his father became leader of the Foot Clan, Raphael reluctantly joined as well, though he remained somewhat distant from it compared to Leonardo. He also remained in contact with their newly-estranged brother Michelangelo, assuring him that he knew how hard it was to be homeless, and that Michelangelo would always have a home with them.

The brothers reunited for a trip to Burnow Island shortly thereafter, where they encountered a mysterious alligator mutant named Leatherhead. Raphael and Leonardo also sought out two of Krang's remaining warriors, Tragg and Granitor, only to be knocked out by Leatherhead. They pursued the alligator to New York, but lost him.

Upon returning home, Raphael and his brothers were horrified to see Kitsune about to kill Splinter, and a brainwashed Alopex assisting her. Kitsune ensnared Raphael's mind and turned him against Leonardo.

Raphael attempted to reconcile Michelangelo with his family in the Chasing Phantoms arc, in which he argued that Michelangelo should be with them, even if their new place was as part of the Foot Clan. However, he became increasingly uncomfortable with Splinter's methods. And upon Splinter's execution of Darius Dun, Raphael changed his mind and decided that Michelangelo had been right all along, leaving the Foot Clan along with Donatello and Leonardo, and moving back into their old lair.

During the days that followed, Raphael participated in a raucous Christmas party, assisted Angel Bridge in bringing a traumatized Alopex back to New York, and infiltrated the Pantheon Family Reunion, with nearly-deadly results. He returned to Dimension X with his brothers in The Trial of Krang story arc, in which they were required to bring back a collection of key witnesses to testify against Krang. During the trial, he participated in the defense of Planet Neutrino from the Malignoid swarm. Afterwards, he and his brothers were attacked by the Collectors, and Raphael was forced to go on an inter-dimensional journey with Ray Stantz, resulting in his body temporarily being stolen by Viking ghosts.

His strained relationship with Splinter became even more so when the Turtles returned to Earth, and found the Foot Clan in conflict with the Triceratons. When Splinter attempted to imprison the Turtles for their own safety, Raphael was particularly outraged. He later accompanied his brothers to attempt to defuse the situation, defeating the Elite Foot ninja in the process. When Burnow Island was attacked by Bishop, Raphael was reluctant to assist the Utroms and Triceratons, but accompanied his brothers anyway.

He was captured by Agent Bishop shortly afterwards and experimented on, as the E.P.F. wished to know what made the Turtles different from other mutants. They intended to kill and dissect him, but Raphael broke free and escaped, reminded of Buck and his own losses and pain from the past. He defeated many E.P.F. personnel, before being rescued by Casey, Angel and Alopex.

Television

1987 animated series
Raphael's personality in the 1987 animated series deviates the most from all other incarnations, though the show's theme song states that Raphael is "cool, but rude" (he takes a slice of pizza with his sai and shoves the rest of it onto the screen before eating the selected slice). Although his violent temper is toned down, Raphael still can get cranky when annoyed or angry.

Raphael is a sardonic wise-guy, and supplies comic relief alongside Michelangelo, whose humor is usually attributed to his carefree and fun-loving behavior, whereas Raphael is more sardonic and sarcastic.

Michelangelo and Raphael’s relationship is not exactly confrontational. However, Raphael would make fun or get annoyed with Michelangelo’s antics. Furthermore, Raphael’s relationship with Leonardo is not as strained in the animated series. Despite this, Raphael usually served as a contrast to Leonardo's "gung-ho do-gooder" personality with his pessimistic, sarcastic remarks. However, Raphael did challenge Leonardo's leadership once in the season 8 episode "Turtle Trek”.

In the 1987 series Raphael's voice actor is Rob Paulsen from season one to season nine with Thom Pinto as the 1989 alternate, Hal Rayle as the 1993 alternate, and Michael Gough in the final season. In Turtles Forever, the 1987 version of Raphael is voiced by Sebastian Arcelus. Raphael also made a couple of appearances in the 2012 series in the episode, The Manhattan Project. He and the other turtles along with Casey and April are seen through a portal by their 2012 counterparts walking on a road and he made a speaking cameo along with the other turtles at the end of the episode when a space worm from the 2012 dimension started terrorizing the street. All four turtles see the worm and spring into action while shouting their famous catchphrase, 'Cowabunga'. This would be Rob Paulsen's second role in the 2012 series, the other being Donatello while he returned to his role as Raphael for the cameo. This would mark the first time in over 28 years the 1987 TMNT cast would return to their roles. Paulsen once again provided the voices of the 1987 Raphael and the 2012 Donatello in the season 4 episode, "Trans-Dimensional Turtles" and the three part series final "Wanted: Bebop & Rocksteady".

Coming Out of Their Shells tour
A live action "Coming Out of Their Shells" concert tour, whose inaugural show was broadcast on pay per view from Radio City Music Hall and later released on VHS in 1990. The concert depicted the Turtles as having formed a band, and beginning their tour in their canonical home of New York City. Raphael is stated during the song Cowabunga as having wrote the music for all the songs performed at the concert, while Michelangelo provided the lyrics. In the inaugural show, Raphael is depicted as playing the drums, including an electronic device that imitates drum sounds that he can control and adjust as necessary. He also splits lead vocals with Michelangelo. Like his film counterpart released the same year, Raphael is depicted as more prone to anger than the rest of his brothers, but ultimately able to get past his issues in order to help the Turtles defeat Shredder's plan to steal all the world's music. In the Making Of VHS tape which was released as a supplement to the Radio City Music Hall show and depicted the Turtles as if they were real people, Raphael and Michelangelo relate the story of how the band started; The two were waiting on a pizza delivery, and Raphael had begun playing on some sewer pipes, and Michelangelo joined in with a bit of singing. Realizing they enjoyed making music, they began to pursue it as a serious hobby, eventually bringing Leonardo and Donatello into their activities, leading to them forming the band and eventually going on tour.

1997 live-action series
Raphael appears in the live action series, Ninja Turtles: The Next Mutation, as well as its crossover episode with Power Rangers in Space portrayed by Mitchell A. Lee Yuen and voiced by Matt Hill.

2003 animated series
In the 2003 series, Raphael is voiced by Greg Abbey and speaks with a Brooklyn accent. In this incarnation, he has a dark, bright green skin color, much more vivid than those of his brothers. This version of Raphael has a personality which is more akin to his Mirage incarnation - he is angrier and more sardonic, but not quite as violent as his darker personality from the comics, unless furious - as proven in one incident where he almost smashed Michelangelo's head in with a pipe after Mikey beat him in a sparring match. The theme song for season 1-3 did not have a part that actually described each turtle individually, but from season 4 onwards it was changed, and stated, "count on Raphael to throw the first punch".

His relationship with Leonardo is one based on rivalry. Every now and then Raphael would argue with him. He is the first of the turtles to shed tears when Leonardo is gravely injured and might not survive. Overall Raphael is close with him.

His relationship with Donatello is a more mellow one compared to his other two brothers. They get along very well and they have a close bond like twins. He is usually the first to compliment his invention. Raphael’s favorite of Donatello’s inventions is the Shell Cycle. He uses it very often.

However Raphael’s relationship with Michelangelo is very difficult. Michelangelo would annoy Raphael with his antics and insults, Raphael would put up a fight or reprimand him. Both of them tend to argue with each other. However when Michelangelo is in danger, Raphael would help him. Overall, it is just a love-hate relationship.

Raphael is generally very protective of his brothers, getting outraged when an enemy harms them or captures them. His best friend is generally regarded as Casey Jones, and is the best man at Casey and April O'Neil's wedding in the final episode of this series.

2012 animated series

Raphael is voiced by Sean Astin in the 2012 series.

Raphael's character design was updated, giving him green eyes as well as a small, lightning-shaped chip out of his plastron across his left shoulder (a scar that resulted from an injury Raphael received as a baby). In this incarnation, Raphael  is described (in the theme song) as having "the most attitude on the team". Raphael can get incredibly explosive when he feels hurt or misunderstood. Sometimes he would walk out on the team to his own thing or prove himself better, which has happened many times.

Raphael’s behavior is inconsistent. Sometimes Raphael would cooperate and take orders and sometimes he will rebel. His relationship with Leonardo is strained. Raphael would erupt at Leonardo and Leonardo would either try to calm him down or confront him. Raphael hated the fact that Leonardo is the leader and often tries to take over as leader, even succeeding twice as the Seasons progressed. In Season 5, Raphael does not backtalk to Leonardo as much as he did in the earlier season probably because Leonardo is the sensei and has more control when it comes to Raphael. Despite all of this, Leonardo and Raphael are actually very close and care deeply for each other. They would team up to fight and challenge Donatello and Michelangelo during training.

Raphael’s relationship with his two brothers Michelangelo and Donatello is not as bad as his relationship with Leonardo but it can be tense at times. Sometimes he would attack or challenge them especially in training and other times they will team up to mock Leonardo. When Michelangelo annoys him, Raphael would insult him. However Raphael is a big brother to Mikey and serves as his role model, reassuring and comforting him and even saying he is awesome at one point. Raphael's relationship with Donatello often involves counterarguments. Donatello and Raphael would sometimes argue and insult each other, like Donatello call him a “big baby” whenever Raphael erupts or when Raphael would call Donatello a “dork”. When Raphael behaves in an upsetting manner and when his brothers confronts him, he will get in denial at first but then he will reluctantly or willingly apologize.

Raphael has a soft spot for his pets which help him calm him down. A normal pet turtle named Spike, which later mutates and becomes this show's version of Slash. Later on he got an alien turtle named Chompy Picasso. Raphael is also petrified of cockroaches until he managed to defeat the mutant cockroach, Spyroach.

2018 animated series

In the 2018 animated series, Rise of the Teenage Mutant Ninja Turtles, Omar Benson Miller voices Raphael, who in this incarnation is the eldest turtle brother and physically biggest brother, being mutated from an Alligator Snapping Turtle. Prior to Leonardo being named the official team leader by Splinter in the second season finale, Raph is the team's de facto leader, a change from previous incarnations, and his enthusiasm and bravado puts him front and center for most of their bizarre adventures. Unlike past versions, he does not use his trademarked Sai, but rather he uses a pair of Tonfa (though he does gain his trademark Sai in the final episodes, after his Tonfa are destroyed by the Shredder). He is also considerably less angry and more serious than previous incarnations, though still eager to get into fights.

In Rise of the Teenage Mutant Ninja Turtles: The Movie, Raph has a heated argument with Leo over the latter's high ego and tells him how hard it is being a leader. Raph sacrifices himself to the Krang to save Leo from being captured and ends up paradoxically possessed for part of the film. Leo helps Raph break free and the two reconcile at the end of the movie after Leo defeats the Krang.

Movies

Original trilogy (1990–1993)
In the 1990 film adaptation, Raphael is played by Josh Pais; the only actor to play both the physical (in the suit) and voice roles as a turtle. He speaks with a distinctive tough-sounding New York accent (that was imitated in the later versions of TMNT), and is the turtle whose character is explored most completely. He has a quick temper, uses profanity and verbally challenges his older brother Leonardo. This film focuses more so on his feeling of isolation from his brothers and sense of regret and anger when Splinter is eventually captured by the Shredder. Here, it is established that he shares a closer relationship with news reporter April O'Neil having saved her from the Foot Clan on several occasions.

In Teenage Mutant Ninja Turtles II: The Secret of the Ooze, he is played by Kenn Troum, and voiced by Laurie Faso, and in the Teenage Mutant Ninja Turtles III film he is played by Matt Hill, and voiced by Tim Kelleher. In the films, he is still angry and occasionally goes off by himself in the second movie, but has a soft spot for the young people the team meets. It is also shown that he has an appreciation for nature as it appears to calm him.

2007 film
In TMNT, Raphael serves as the main protagonist in the film, voiced by Nolan North. In Leonardo's absence, he has spent his nights as an armored vigilante known as The Nightwatcher. His time as the Nightwatcher is one of the few during which Raphael uses a different ninjutsu weapon, the manriki: weighted chains that can be concealed in the hands and used from considerable distances. Unlike his sai, the manriki are typically not lethal weapons, though they could crush a skull if used with enough force.

In this movie, the animosity between Raphael and Leonardo is the most straight-forward due to Raphael's anger at his brother leaving as well as the growing injustice in New York. He resents Leonardo's bossing them around and treating them like "[Leo's] little soldiers" when he (at least in Raphael's opinion) abandoned them for at least a year. This leads to a physical confrontation between Raphael and Leonardo and resulting in Raphael almost mortally wounding Leonardo before retreating - suddenly realising what he was about to do, and running in fear from his anger.  After Leonardo is kidnapped, Raphael then acknowledges his mistake to Master Splinter and confesses what happened and why he understood the reason Leonardo was chosen as the leader.  Master Splinter then explains to Raphael that his tendency to put the world's problems on his own shoulders as a protector of the weak is a great quality and that while he may not be his favorite student at times, it does not mean he is his least favorite son.  Master Splinter then tells Raphael that his strength, his passion, and his loyalty to the people he cares about are also merits of a great leader, if it can be tempered with compassion.  After Raphael, the Turtles, as well as Casey and April rescue Leonardo, Raphael is shown to be eager to fight alongside his brother instead of against him.

Raph's relationship with Donatello is also explored further, when Donatello makes it clear that he does not like the Nightwatcher. This is due to the Nightwatcher using tactics like Raph's and due to the reason that Donnie believes that the team still exists where as Raph does not. Donnie also does not support Mikey's admiration of The Nightwatcher and even though Donnie does not know that Raph is The Nightwatcher, believes that Raph should get a normal job to support the family. Donnie's dislike of The Nightwatcher alone seems to mildly anger Raph and then there is the fact that Splinter put Donnie in charge of the turtles while Leo was away. This factor annoys Raph a little more and leads to Raphael almost punching Donnie in the face; smirking when his brother flinches.

Reboot series (2014–2016)
Raphael appears in Teenage Mutant Ninja Turtles portrayed by Alan Ritchson. In the film, he is aggressive and struggles with following orders. He often loses his temper and has fierce independence, which does not sit well with his older brother Leonardo. He is the first turtle that April O' Neil sees after stopping the Foot Clan, although she does not get a good look at him and thinks he is a man. When April takes their picture, Raph threatens her even after Donatello erases her phone's memory data. In the battle at the turtle's lair with the Foot, Raph is crushed under rubble and is presumed dead. Because of this, he is the only turtle not captured by the Foot. When he awakes, he finds a dying Splinter who tells him and April to save his brothers. They team up with Vern Fenwick to help him save them from Sacks Industries, where he fights Shredder to buy April and Vern time to do so. After rescuing Leonardo, Donatello, and Michelangelo and defeating the Shredder, Raphael and his brothers use the mutagen to save Splinter's life. He, along with Donatello and Leonardo, do not try to get April's attention unlike Michelangelo who does voice his feelings to April. Although in the end of the movie he does show appreciation to her for sacrificing everything for them. In this incarnation, Raphael is not as hot headed and does not clash with Leonardo over leadership however they have a brief argument over the Hatamishi which Raphael refuses to go to and claims he will leave which Leo debunks. He is more close to his brothers in the film than in most adaptations. He does still get annoyed at Donatello when he does talk of his calculations in a way the others do not understand. He is the only turtle in the film to stay true to his other adaptations by not wearing any footwear.

In the sequel, Teenage Mutant Ninja Turtles: Out of the Shadows, Raphael is shown to be more like his standard self. He becomes enraged when he learns Leonardo has commanded Donnie not to reveal to him or Mikey about the Purple Ooze being able to turn them into humans, stating that Leo broke the third code of the ninja (honor) by lying to his brothers. He disobeys direct orders from Leo and has no problem lying to April and Casey in order to get them to go along on a mission with him. He does still show caring for his brothers as him and Mikey are shown to be very close, with the two of them pulling pranks on Casey Jones and Raph becoming enraged when Krang nearly kills Mikey. Raphael in the film is also shown to have a fear of great heights, possibly due to the events of the first film; while the other turtles leap out of an airplane with little thought Raphael puts on a parachute and even then must psych himself up to perform the jump.

DC crossover film
Raphael appears in the direct-to-video crossover film Batman vs. Teenage Mutant Ninja Turtles, voiced by Darren Criss. In the beginning of the movie, he is seen among with his brothers saving Barbara Gordon and stopping the Foot. They then fought the Penguin and his goons and later Batman, who easily defeats them and takes one of his sais.

Mutant Mayhem 
Raphael is set to appear in the upcoming Teenage Mutant Ninja Turtles: Mutant Mayhem, the first computer-animated Teenage Mutant Ninja Turtles flim since TMNT (2007). It is confirmed that he will be voiced by an actual teenager, with Brady Noon voicing him.

Video games
In the first few video games, based on the 1987 cartoon, Raphael was an unpopular character because of the short range of his weapon. He is the least skilled Turtle, the same goes for the video game based on the 2007 movie TMNT. He appears in TMNT: Smash Up as a playable character, with Frank Frankson reprising his role. The Nightwatcher also makes an appearance as a separate playable character.

Raphael is one of the main playable characters in Teenage Mutant Ninja Turtles: Out of the Shadows video game, where he is voiced by Carlos Alazraqui. His special move is Iron Fists, where he puts on iron gloves which have extremely high power, but little range. Raphael also appears in the 2014 film-based game, voiced by Roy Samuelson.

Raphael is featured as one of the playable characters from Teenage Mutant Ninja Turtles as DLC in Injustice 2, voiced by Ben Rausch. While Leonardo is the default turtle outside the gear loadout, he, Michelangelo and Donatello can only be picked through the said loadout selection similar to the premier skin characters.

Raphael is featured as a TMNT season pass in Smite as a Loki skin, voiced by Mark Whitten. He is also available as a skin in Brawlhalla.

Raphael appears in Pixel Gun 3D as a skin called “Super Turtle”.

Raphael is also a main playable character in the sequel to Turtles in Time, titled Teenage Mutant Ninja Turtles: Shredder's Revenge.  In the game, Raphael is now the turtle with the most attack power and average speed, as opposed to Turtles in Time, where he had the highest speed with average attack power. He carries over his limited range from the original game. This is the first official Teenage Mutant Ninja Turtles game in which he will be played by his original voice actor, Rob Paulsen.

Reception

In 2008, Raphael shared the fifth place with Leonardo on TechCrunch's list of Top 10 Video Game Ninja Characters. As mentioned above, he came in 23rd on IGN's list of Top 100 comic book heroes.

See also

 Tsundere

References

External links
Raphael profile on official TMNT web site
Teenage Mutant Ninja Turtles Names and Character Biographies

Animal superheroes
Child superheroes
Comics characters introduced in 1984
Comic martial artists
Fictional kobudōka
Fictional characters from New York City
Fictional comedians
Fictional melee weapons practitioners
Fictional mutants
Fictional ninja
Fictional Ninjutsu practitioners
Fictional stick-fighters
Fictional turtles
Fighting game characters
Male characters in comics
Superheroes who are adopted
Teenage characters in comics
Teenage characters in television
Teenage Mutant Ninja Turtles characters
Teenage superheroes
Vigilante characters in comics